"Not Giving In" is a song by British drum and bass band Rudimental. It features the vocals from John Newman and Alex Clare. The song was released in the United Kingdom on 18 November 2012 as the third single from their debut studio album, Home. It came in at number 16 in the 2012 Hottest 100, announced on Australia Day 2013. It was featured in the first episode of season three of Teen Wolf. The song was also used in a 2014 FIFA World Cup commercial for Mercedes-Benz sponsoring the Germany National Football Team. The song is also featured in the Scottish Government's advertising for keeping up with COVID-19 restrictions.

Music video
A music video to accompany the release of "Not Giving In", written and directed by Josh Cole, was first released onto YouTube on 17 October 2012 at a total length of five minutes and twenty-nine seconds. The video was filmed in the shanty towns of Manila, Philippines, and follows the life of two brothers growing up in poverty. The two later go their separate ways, as one manages to escape the city's underbelly and succeeds in breakdancing, whereas the other becomes trapped in a life of gang violence, drug crime and a murder, eventually resulting in his death. The video has won several awards, including best dance video at the UK MVA's and best new director at the Cannes Lions festival.

Reception

Critical reception
Lewis Corner of Digital Spy gave the song a positive review stating:
Lashings of jazzy brass, twinkling piano and rumbling bass hears them picking up almost exactly where they left off. "This time I'm gonna be stronger/ I'm not giving in," John Newman declares in his smooth tone, richer than a double chocolate pud and just as satisfying. Rudimental may not have delivered a game-changer, but when your sound is still this fresh, why bother? .

In popular culture
From 2014 onwards, the song has been used as the team entrance song for the Port Adelaide Football Club at home games at the redeveloped Adelaide Oval. The song was used in a Super Rugby advertising campaign for KFC in New Zealand, during the 2020 season.

Finnish misheard lyrics
The song became a meme in Finland, as "not giving in", when sung in the chorus, sounds similar to "nakkivene" which translates to "wiener boat" in Finnish. When Rudimental performed the song during Provinssirock 2014, people threw wieners with small "sails" at the stage.

Track listings

Charts and certifications

Weekly charts

Certifications

Release history

References

2012 singles
2011 songs
Alex Clare songs
John Newman (singer) songs
Rudimental songs
Asylum Records singles
Song recordings produced by Rudimental
Songs written by Amir Amor
Songs written by John Newman (singer)